Georges Gurvitch (October 20, 1894, Novorossiysk – December 12, 1965, Paris) was a Russian-born French sociologist and jurist. One of the leading sociologists of his times, he was a specialist of the sociology of knowledge. In 1944 he founded the journal Cahiers internationaux de Sociologie. He held a chair in sociology at the Sorbonne in Paris. An outspoken advocate of Algerian decolonization, Gurvitch and his wife were the victim of terrorist attack by the far-right nationalist group, L'O.A.S on June 22, 1962. Their apartment was destroyed by a bomb, and they took refuge for a time at the house of painter Marc Chagall.

Gurvitch is an important figure in the development of sociology of law. Like other legal sociologists, he insisted that law is not merely the rules or decisions produced, interpreted and enforced by agencies of the state, such as legislatures, courts and police. Groups and communities of various kinds, whether formally structured or informally organised, produce regulation for themselves and others, which can properly be considered law from a sociological standpoint. Gurvitch's legal pluralism is, however, far more rigorous and radical than that of most legal sociologists and locates an immense variety of types of law in the various kinds of sociality—or social interaction—that he distinguished in his writings. He saw the need to stress the reality and significance of social law and social rights, in opposition to what he termed individual law. His Bill of Social Rights, drafted at the end of World War II was an attempt to state a blueprint of a legal framework of social law for a postwar world in which the idea of human rights had become newly powerful.

The sociologist and ideologue of the 1979 Iranian revolution Ali Shariati studied under Gurvitch in the 1960s during his studies in France at the University of Sorbonne.

Works
 Essai de Sociologie, (1939)
 Sociology of law, (1942)
 The Bill of Social Rights, (1945)
 La vocation actuelle de la sociologie, (1950)
 Le concept des classes sociales de Marx à nos jours, (1954)
 The Spectrum of Social Time, (1958)
 Dialectique et sociologie, (1962)
 The Social Frameworks of Knowledge, (1972)

Studies of Gurvitch's works
 Banakar, Reza, “Integrating Reciprocal Perspectives: On Georges Gurvitch’s Theory of Immediate Jural Experience” in 16 /1 Canadian Journal of Law and Society. 2001. Reprinted in Roger Cotterrell, ed., Law in Social Theory. Aldershot, Ashgate. 2006. Available at SSRN https://ssrn.com/abstract=1777167
 Banakar, Reza, “Georges Gurvitch” in Encyclopedia of Law and Society: American and Global Perspectives. Thousand Oaks: SAGE. 2006.
 Belley, Jean-Guy,  "Georges Gurvitch et les professionnels de la pensée juridique" in 4 Droit et Société 353-70 (1986)
 Bosserman, Phillip, Dialectical Sociology: An Analysis of the Sociology of Georges Gurvitch. Boston: Porter Sargent (1968)
 Carbonnier, Jean, "Gurvitch et les juristes" in 4 Droit et Société 347-51 (1986).
 Choi, Chaanshik, Freedom and Determinism: The Promethean Sociology of Georges Gurvitch (Ph.D. Dissertation at New School for Social Research, New York, N.Y. 1978)  
 Hunt, Alan, "The Sociology of Law of Gurvitch and Timasheff: A Critique of Theories of Normative Integration" in Research in Law and Sociology, Vol. 2, pp. 169–204 (1979),
 McDonald, Pauline, "The Legal Sociology of Georges Gurvitch" in 6 British Journal of Law and Society 24-52 (1979).
 Noreau, Pierre and Andre-Jean Arnaud, "The Sociology of Law in France: Trends and Paradigms" in 25  Journal of Law and Society 258-83 (1998).
 Swedberg, Richard. Sociology as Disenchantment: The Evolution of the Work of Georges Gurvitch. Atlantic Highlands, NJ: Humanities Press, 1982.

References

1894 births
1965 deaths
People from Novorossiysk
People from Kuban Oblast
Russian Jews
Mensheviks
White Russian emigrants to Germany
White Russian emigrants to Czechoslovakia
White Russian emigrants to France
French people of Russian-Jewish descent
French sociologists
Russian sociologists
Jewish sociologists
French male writers
Saint Petersburg State University alumni
Academic staff of the University of Paris
Foreign members of the Serbian Academy of Sciences and Arts